Bernard Martin (1882 – 19 June 1956) was a New Zealand politician of the Labour Party and one of the party's pioneers.

Biography

Early life and career
Martin was born in England in 1882. He migrated to New Zealand in 1900 and became involved in the local union movement. He first worked in Taranaki in butter factories before moving to Auckland in 1908. He was a founding member of the Workers' Educational Association (WEA).

In 1913 he became secretary of the Auckland Brewery Workers' Union until 1917 when he became secretary of the Coach Workers' Union. He was then elected a member of the first Executive of the Labour Party in 1916 and was president of the party's  branch. He was also the President of the Auckland Fabian Club and secretary of the Auckland Labour Representation Committee (1928–29, 1930–34).

Political career
A frequent candidate in local elections, he was on both the Auckland City Council (1931–33, 1935–38) and the Auckland University Council (1936–56). Between 1935 and 1938 (when Labour held a majority on the Council) Martin served as Deputy-Mayor.

Martin was appointed to the New Zealand Legislative Council in 1936 and served for two terms until 8 March 1950. He was Chairman of Committees from 1939 to 1948, when he was promoted to Speaker from 1948 to the end of his tenure. Martin was regarded right throughout his career as an excellent chairman.

Death
Martin died on 19 June 1956 in Auckland. He was survived by his wife, son, daughter and five grandchildren.

Notes

References

|-

1882 births
1956 deaths
English emigrants to New Zealand
New Zealand trade unionists
Auckland City Councillors
Deputy mayors of places in New Zealand
New Zealand Labour Party MLCs
Members of the New Zealand Legislative Council
Speakers of the New Zealand Legislative Council